Ross Anthony Kolodziej (born May 11, 1978) is a former American football defensive tackle and current defensive line coach at Stanford. He was drafted by the New York Giants in the seventh round of the 2001 NFL Draft. He played college football at Wisconsin

Kolodziej was also a member of the San Francisco 49ers, Arizona Cardinals, Minnesota Vikings and Omaha Nighthawks.

Professional Playing Career
Ross spent seven years in the NFL after initially being drafted by the Giants in the seventh round of the 2001 NFL Draft.

Coaching career
Ross began his coaching career at his alma mater working as a graduate assistant for the 2012 season. He then followed Paul Chryst to Pitt were he served as an assistant strength and conditioning coach in 2013 . For the 2014 season Ross was promoted to head strength and conditioning coach. In 2015 Ross once again followed Chryst this time back to Wisconsin were he served as the head strength and conditioning coach from 2015 to 2020. In 2021 he was named the team’s new defensive line coach taking over for Inoke Breckterfield, who left to join the staff at Vanderbilt.

Personal life
Kolodziej and his wife, Miriam, have four children; Liz, Taylor, Asher and Abram.

References

External links
Just Sports Stats

1978 births
Living people
People from Stevens Point, Wisconsin
Players of American football from Wisconsin
American football defensive tackles
Wisconsin Badgers football players
New York Giants players
San Francisco 49ers players
Arizona Cardinals players
Minnesota Vikings players
Las Vegas Locomotives players
Omaha Nighthawks players
Wisconsin Badgers football coaches
Pittsburgh Panthers football coaches